John Todd was a professional rugby league footballer who played in the 1910s and 1920s.

Playing career
John Todd made his début for Wakefield Trinity during October 1914, and he played his last match for Wakefield Trinity during February 1921, he appears to have scored no drop-goals (or field-goals as they are currently known in Australasia), but prior to the 1974–75 season all goals, whether; conversions, penalties, or drop-goals, scored 2-points, consequently prior to this date drop-goals were often not explicitly documented, therefore '0' drop-goals may indicate drop-goals not recorded, rather than no drop-goals scored. In addition, prior to the 1949–50 season, the archaic field-goal was also still a valid means of scoring points.

County honours
John Todd won cap(s) for Yorkshire while at Wakefield Trinity.

References

External links
Search for "Todd" at rugbyleagueproject.org

Place of birth missing
Place of death missing
Rugby league wingers
English rugby league players
Wakefield Trinity players
Year of birth missing
Year of death missing
Yorkshire rugby league team players